Adoor (sometimes spelled Adur) is a Municipality in Pathanamthitta district of Kerala State, India. It is the headquarters of Adoor Taluk and Adoor Revenue Division.

Etymology
Adoor (Ad-oor) in Malayalam translates as "Ad" means "separated" (adarnu) and "oor" means "place" or "land". So it means "adarnu kittiya ooru" in Malayalam and in English it means "An obtained separated land".

History 

The history of Adoor is directly connected to the history of Kollam district. During the 1st century A.D., most of the places in Kollam district were ruled by the Ay Kingdom, with their headquarters at south Travancore. It is known that during the rule of the Ay Kings, a Buddhist Monastery existed in Adoor. Some megalithic monuments like dolmens, dating back to the Neolithic period, have been discovered in the Enadimangalam village of Adoor Taluk.

Adoor was once part of Ilayidathu Dynasty and Pandalam dynasty. In 1741, Venad Maharaja Marthandavarma included Adoor to the Travancore Kingdom. King Marthandavarma once came to Adoor to hide from Ettuvettil Pillai (a wealthy family who tried to capture King Marthandavarma and to get hold of his throne) and sought the help from Chittundayil house but it was refused and then support and shelter was provided by the grandmother of Nellimuttil family at Adoor, in the later days, after he became the King he then made revenge to the Chittundayil house and granted help to the Nellimuttil house. During the rule of Dharmaraja, a notable event was the battle against Tippu Sultan, where travancore made alliance with the East India Company. During the rule of Rani Gowri Parvathy Bayi, in 1812 A.D., pandalam was annexed to the kingdom of Travancore. The Anantharamapuram market situated at Parakkode is known to be one of the oldest, largest and busiest market during the Travancore era. After India got its independence in 1947, the Maharaja of Travancore refused to join Indian Union, but later had to agree. On 1 July 1949, Travancore and Cochin States were integrated and the Maharaja of Travancore became Rajpramukh of Travancore-Cochin State. On 1 November 1956, The State of Kerala was formed integrating the earlier regions of Travancore, Cochin and Malabar. After that, Adoor was in Kollam district until a new 13th district called, the Pathanamthitta District came into existence as a separate administrative unit on the 1 November 1982. The newly formed Adoor Taluk comprised nine Villages of Kunnathur Taluk and two villages of Mavelikkara Taluk of former Kollam and Alappuzha districts. On 1 April 1990, Adoor municipality came into existence and the area under Adoor municipality is presently known as Adoor Town.

Adoor was part of Central Travancore and was never directly under British rule. Adoor was a major town of both wealthy Hindu families and notable Saint Thomas Christian families. Adoor was never captured by King Marthanadavarma.

Adoor Dharma Hospital (now known as Adoor General Hospital) was established in the 1880s during Travancore rule. 

In 1914, the first school opened in Adoor: Adoor Malayalam School, known today as Adoor Govt. UP School.

In 1934, Mahatma Gandhi visited Adoor and laid the foundation stone of the present SNDP building situated near a private bus stand. The message of khadi and charkha gained more attention during this time. During the 1940s, communism started emerging in Adoor. SNDP and NSS have made great contributions to the development of Adoor.

Administration 
Adoor is part of the Pathanamthitta district and is one of the two major revenue divisions of Pathanamthitta. Before the formation of the Pathanamthitta district in 1982, Adoor belonged to the Kollam district. Adoor's Assembly Constituency is a part of the newly formed Pathanamthitta Loksabha with the present MP being Shri Anto Antony.  The present MLA of Adoor is Shri Chittayam Gopakumar.

Municipality Wards 
Adoor Town consists of 28 wards of Adoor Municipality.

Adoor Revenue Division 
Adoor Taluk consists of two municipal towns: Adoor and Pandalam. Adoor is one among the only two revenue divisions of the Pathanamthitta district. The Adoor Revenue Division includes Kozhencherry (Pathanamthitta), Konni, and Adoor Taluks.  The revenue division was previously located in the Kollam District. Adoor is located between the two major cities of Trivandrum and Kochi in south Kerala.

Thaluks under Adoor Revenue Division

Adoor Thaluk

Municipalities and Block Panchayats of Adoor Thaluk
With headquarters at Adoor town, the Adoor Thaluk consists of two Municipalities and two Block Panchayats. Pandalam Block Panchayat includes two Panchayats (Thumpamon, Pandalam Thekkekara) from Adoor Thaluk, while the remaining are under Kozhenchery Thaluk.

Panchayaths in Adoor Thaluk

Demographics 

The population under the age of 6 was 2,411. 3,621 residents belonged to a scheduled caste and 38 belonged to a scheduled tribe. The literacy rate of Adoor was 96.31%, which is higher than the state average of 94.00%. In Adoor, male literacy was 97.49% while the female literacy rate was 95.27%. Adoor has a large population of NRIs, the majority of them working in Middle Eastern countries. Majority of the population are Hindus followed by Christians and Muslims. Adoor is a peaceful town with people from all religions living in harmony

Nearly 90% of the population resides in rural regions and only 10% reside in the urban area.

Villages 

Ammakandakara
Nellimukal

Hospitals 
 Govt. General Hospital, Adoor

Lifeline superspeciality hospital and fertility clinic, Adoor
Mount Zion medical college Hospital, Adoor
Hollycross Hospital, Adoor
Maria Hospital, Adoor
Mount Sinai Medical Centre, Paranthal
Government Veterinary Hospital, Adoor

Adoor has at least four medical colleges within 40 km radius or one hour travel proximity. Famous Medical colleges and hospitals include Konni Government Medical College (28 km), Pushpagiri Medical College (31 km), Believers Church Medical College Hospitals (37 km) and Muthootu Medical Centre Pathanamthitta (18 km).

Landmarks 
Adoor is home to many places of worship, including the Mannadi Temple.
 

 
 Sree Narayanapuram Mahavishnu Temple

St. Thomas Orthodox Cathedral, Kannamcode
St. Mary's Orthodox Church & Holy MarthaMariam Pilgrim Centre, Karuvatta

Transportation

Road 

Adoor is a junction with major roads connecting it to Ernakulam, Trivandrum, Kayankulam, Punalur, Pathanamthitta and Kollam. The only means of transport in Adoor is roadways. There are two bus stands in Adoor. KSRTC bus stand has got 24 hours bus services with daily interstate, interdistrict and town connectivity. The municipal bus stand near bypass stations all private busses.

KSRTC provides services to nearby states of Karnataka and Tamil Nadu. Major services include super deluxe, superfast, and fast passengers to Mangalore, Manipal, Marthandam, Thalakkulam, Sulthan Batheri, Perikkalur, Kannur, Udayagiri, Kozhikode, Thrissur, Ernakulam, Trivandrum.

Bus services from other depots towards Bangalore (Scania), Sulliya (Super Deluxe), Batheri (Super Deluxe), Thenkasi (Fast Passenger), Pazhani (Super Fast, Fast Passenger) are also available.

Private bus services like Kallada, Kerala Lines, and Rukma have daily services towards Bangalore, Chennai, and other destinations from Adoor.

Being the center of southern Kerala, Adoor has good highways and modern roads for travel and the shipment of goods. Adoor has the MC road (SH1) passing through it until Trivandrum and the National Highway 183A passing through Adoor connecting Pathanamthitta and other major places. Built during the era of the Travancore Dynasty, recently MC road from Kazhakoottam to Adoor was raised to the status of safety road. This is the first safety road project to be built in Kerala. Adoor bypass starts from Nellimutilpadi in Adoor, passes through Moonnalam, and ends at Karuvatta in Adoor. The Kayamkulam-Punalur (SH8) road also passes through Adoor making it the centre of Kayamkulam and Punalur. KP Road connects Adoor to various places like Charummood, Pathanapuram. People mostly use MC-Road in Adoor for traveling to Trivandrum rather than using National Highway 66 to avoid traffic jams. This makes the MC-Road the most popular route for traveling to Trivandrum. The National Highway 183, which Starts from Kollam, passes through Adoor and ends at Theni in Tamil Nadu. There are plans to bring ring roads within Adoor. The upcoming projects of renovating and expanding 110 crores Anayadi- Koodal road and 42crore Ezhamkulam - Kaipattoor road are under process.

Airports 

Railways 
A railway station was planned for Adoor but this plan was shifted to Mavelikkara. There are considerations about bringing a major junction railway station to Adoor. The proposed railway station will have railway flyovers and nearly eight tracks with lines Kayamkulam-Punalur via Adoor, Chengannur-Thiruvananthapuram via Adoor.

Education 

 College of Engineering, Adoor
 Kendriya Vidyalaya Adoor

Notable people 

 Adoor Bhasi, actor
 Adoor Bhavani, actress
 Adoor Gopalakrishnan, director
 Govindankutty, actor-anchor
 Gouri G. Kishan, actress
 Adoor Pankajam, actress
 Adoor Prakash, former Kerala Minister, present Attingal MP
 E. V. Krishna Pillai, writer

References

External links 
 http://www.adoormunicipality.in/ 

Cities and towns in Pathanamthitta district